Sliman Mansour ( also Suleiman or Suliman, born 1947),  is a Palestinian painter, considered an important figure among contemporary Palestinian artists. Mansour is considered an artist of the intifada whose work gave visual expression to the cultural concept of sumud. Palestinian artist and scholar Samia Halaby has identified Mansour as part of the Liberation Art Movement and cites his important work as an artist and cultural practitioner before and after the Intifada.

Biography
During the Intifada, Mansour was part of the "New Visions" group of Palestinian artists that included Tayseer Barakat, Vera Tamari, and Nabil Anani. This collective turned to earthworks and mixed media and assemblage using materials derived from the Palestinian environment in order to boycott Israeli art supplies in protest of the ongoing occupation. In 1988 he made a series of four paintings on destroyed Palestinian villages, the four villages being  Yibna, Yalo, Imwas and Bayt Dajan.

He is a co-author of Both Sides of Peace: Israeli and Palestinian Political Poster Art, published in 1998 by the Contemporary Art Museum with University of Washington Press.

See also
 Palestinian art

References

Bibliography

 
 
 
 

Sliman Mansour, monograph published in 2011 by Palestinian Art Court-Al Hoash, Jerusalem, with essays by Bashir Makhoul, Nicola Gray and Tina Sherwell

External links
 www.legacy-project.org
Palestinian Poster Project
Barjeel Art Foundation
Alhoush House of Arab Art and Design
Sliman Mansour's official website

1947 births
Living people
Artist authors
Palestinian poster artists
Palestinian painters
Palestinian non-fiction writers
Palestinian contemporary artists

People from Birzeit